= Frank Chongwoo Park =

South Korean electrical engineer

Frank Chongwoo Park is a South Korean electrical engineer. Of Seoul National University, he was named Fellow of the Institute of Electrical and Electronics Engineers (IEEE) in 2013 for "contributions to geometric methods in robot mechanics".
